Neopolycesta is a genus of beetles in the family Buprestidae, containing the following species:

 Neopolycesta caffra (Thunberg, 1787)
 Neopolycesta inornata (Peringuey, 1888)
 Neopolycesta kerremansella Obenberger, 1931

References

Buprestidae genera